Nysa may refer to:

Greek Mythology 
 Nysa (mythology) or Nyseion, the mountainous region or mount (various traditional locations), where nymphs raised the young god Dionysus 
 Nysiads, nymphs of Mount Nysa who cared for and taught the infant Dionysus

Historical figures 
 Nysa (wife of Pharnaces I of Pontus), daughter of Laodice IV and Antiochus, wife of Pharnaces I of Pontus
 Nysa of Cappadocia, daughter of Pharnaces I of Pontus and Nysa, wife of Ariarathes V of Cappadocia and mother Ariarathes VI of Cappadocia
 Nysa, one of the daughters of Mithridates V of Pontus and Laodice VI
 Nysa, one of the daughters of Mithridates VI of Pontus from his concubine 
 Nysa (wife of Nicomedes III of Bithynia), daughter of Laodice of Cappadocia and Ariarathes VI of Cappadocia, the first wife of Nicomedes III of Bithynia
 Nysa (daughter of Nicomedes III of Bithynia), daughter of Nicomedes III of Bithynia and Nysa

Settlements and jurisdictions

Turkey
 Nysa on the Maeander, (Caria) an ancient city and bishopric in Asia Minor (Anatolia), ruins in the Sultanhisar district of Aydın Province, restored as Latin Titular bishopric of Nysa in Asia in 1933
 Nysa (Cappadocia), an ancient city in Cappadocia
 Nisa (Lycia), an ancient city in Lycia

Greece
 Nysa (Boeotia), a town of ancient Boeotia
 Nysa (Euboea), a town of ancient Euboea
 Nysa (Naxos), a town of ancient Naxos
 Nysa (Thrace), a town of ancient Thrace and later Macedonia

Other
 Nysa (Alexander), a town spared by Alexander the Great during his invasion of Central Asia
 Nysa, Poland, a town in southern Poland on the Nysa Kłodzka river
 Nysa-Scythopolis, the Hellenistic Bet She'an in northern Israel
 Nisa, Turkmenistan

Rivers 
 Nysa Łużycka, Polish name for the Lusatian Neisse, a river in the Czech Republic, Poland and Germany, flowing to Oder River near the towns of Guben and Gubin
 Nysa Kłodzka, a river in Poland, named for the town of Kłodzka, in English called the Eastern Neisse; a tributary of the Oder (Odra)
 Nysa Szalona, a river in Poland, the Raging Neisse; a tributary of the Kaczawa in Poland
 Nysa Mała, a river in Poland, the Little Neisse; a tributary of the Nysa Szalona

Other uses 
 44 Nysa, an asteroid
 NKS Nysa, a men's volleyball team playing in Polish Volleyball League
 ZSD Nysa, an Automobile produced in Nysa, Poland from the 1950s to the early 1990s
 Neisse University, a university in the border triangle of Czech Republic, Poland and Germany

See also 
 Neisse (disambiguation)
 Nyssa (disambiguation)
 Nisa (disambiguation)